Rene Rinnekangas (born 25 September 1999) is a Finnish snowboarder. He competed in the 2018 Winter Olympics in both slopestyle and BigAir, placing 28th and 22nd respectively. He competed in the 2019 Winter X Games in slopestyle earning a Silver Medal, and in BigAir, placing 5th. He competed in the 2020 Winter X Games placing 8th in the slopestyle competition, 4th in BigAir, and competed in the Wendy's Knuckle Huck ranking 5th. The 2021 Winter X Games were held with no audience due to the COVID-19 Pandemic. Rinnekangas placed 3rd in slopestyle earning a bronze medal and placed 8th in BigAir. During the 2022 Winter X Games, Rinnekangas finished 5th in slopestyle and secured a bronze medal for 3rd place in Mens BigAir.

Rinnekangas started snowboarding at age four alongside his older brother, Riko, in the small town of Iisalmi, Finland. "I just had to try it out because everything he did was the coolest thing ever.". He also plays bass guitar in his brother's punk bank, Kätfish.

References

External links

1999 births
Living people
Snowboarders at the 2018 Winter Olympics
Snowboarders at the 2022 Winter Olympics
Finnish male snowboarders
Olympic snowboarders of Finland
Snowboarders at the 2016 Winter Youth Olympics
People from Iisalmi
Sportspeople from North Savo
X Games athletes